Binchy is a surname. Notable people named Binchy are:

 D. A. Binchy (1899–1989), scholar of linguistics and early Irish law, ambassador
 Maeve Binchy (1940–2012), novelist and playwright, one of Ireland's most celebrated writers
 William Binchy, law professor at Trinity College Dublin